The 1971–72 Washington Huskies men's basketball team represented the University of Washington for the 1971–72 NCAA college basketball season. Led by first-year head coach Marv Harshman, the Huskies were members of the Pacific-8 Conference and played their home games on campus at Hec Edmundson Pavilion in Seattle, Washington.

The 25-team NCAA tournament included only one Pac-8 team, champion UCLA. The Huskies did not play in the 16-team National Invitation Tournament (NIT) because the Pac-8 did not allow it. This rule was changed after this season and USC played in the NIT in 1973.

Previous head coach Tex Winter left in May 1971 to become head coach of the NBA's San Diego Rockets, who moved to Houston the next month. Harshman was hired in June, and led the Huskies for fourteen seasons. He was previously the head coach at rival Washington State for thirteen years, preceded by thirteen years at his alma mater, Pacific Lutheran.

Roster

References

External links
Sports Reference – Washington Huskies: 1971–72 basketball season

Washington Huskies men's basketball seasons
Washington Huskies
Washington
Washington